Durban's Super Giants is a South African professional Twenty20 franchise cricket team that first competed in the inaugural season of SA20 tournament. The team is based in Durban, South Africa, and was formed in 2022. The team's home-ground is the Kingsmead Cricket Ground. The team is coached by Lance Klusener.

The franchise is owned by the RPSG Group.

Current squad
The team's squad for the first season of the competition was:
 Players with international caps are listed in bold

Administration and support staff

Statistics

Most runs

Most wickets

References

Cricket in South Africa
2022 establishments in South Africa
Sport in Durban
Cricket clubs established in 2022
Sports clubs in South Africa
SA20
RPSG Group